Larry Weir Hurtado,  (December 29, 1943 – November 25, 2019), was an American New Testament scholar, historian of early Christianity, and Emeritus Professor of New Testament Language, Literature, and Theology at the University of Edinburgh (1996–2011). He was the head of the School of Divinity from 2007 to 2010, and was until August 2011 Director of the Centre for the Study of Christian Origins at the University of Edinburgh.

Biography
Born in Kansas City, Missouri, on December 29, 1943, Hurtado was educated at Central Bible College and Trinity Evangelical Divinity School. He completed his Ph.D. in 1973 at Case Western Reserve University under the supervision of Eldon Jay Epp with the dissertation Codex Washingtonianus in the Gospel of Mark: Its Textual Relationships and Scribal Characteristics.

His first academic appointment was at Regent College in Vancouver, British Columbia, Canada, where he taught from 1975 to 1978.  Prior to moving to Canada in 1975 he pastored a church in Chicago's most Jewish suburb, Skokie, Illinois. Thereafter he moved to the Department of Religion at the University of Manitoba in Winnipeg, where he was promoted to full Professor in 1988 and taught until 1996. During his time there, he established the University of Manitoba Institute for the Humanities and served as initial Director from 1990 to 1992. Shortly after his appointment at the University of Edinburgh, he established the Centre for the Study of Christian Origins, which focuses on Christianity in the first three centuries.

He made significant advances in understanding Jewish monotheism and early Christian devotion to Jesus. He was an authority on the Gospels (especially the Gospel of Mark), the Apostle Paul, early Christology, the Jewish background of the New Testament, and textual criticism of the New Testament. He was perhaps most well known for his studies on the early emergence of a devotion to Jesus expressed in beliefs about Jesus sharing God's glory, and in a "devotional pattern" in which Jesus features prominently. Hurtado argued that this Jesus-devotion comprises a novel "mutation" in ancient Jewish monotheistic practice. In his later publications, he also urged greater awareness of the historical value of earliest Christian manuscripts as key physical artefacts of early Christianity, drawing attention to such phenomena as the nomina sacra (distinctive abbreviated forms of certain Greek words, e.g., Theos, Iesous, Kyrios, Christos), the Christian preference for the codex book form, and a number of other features.

He was elected a member of the Studiorum Novi Testamenti Societas in 1984, and received the Rh Institute Award for Outstanding Contributions to Scholarship and Research in the Humanities in 1986. He was elected a Fellow of the Royal Society of Edinburgh in 2008, and President of the British New Testament Society from 2009 to 2012. He won research grants from the Social Sciences and Humanities Research Council of Canada, the British Academy, and the Arts and Humanities Research Council (UK). He gave invited lectures in many universities in the UK and other countries, and was a visiting fellow at Macquarie University in Australia in 2005.

The School of Divinity announced that Hurtado had died of cancer in his sleep on November 25, 2019. Holly J. Carey (Point University) wrote an obituary in his honour on Christianity Today.

Works

Books

As editor

Articles and chapters

References

External links
 
 Larry Hurtado's page at The University of Edinburgh
 John the Baptizer, Jewish Judea, and the Virginal Conception, from a discussion called Jesus and the Gospel—What Really Happened?
 That Curious Idea of Resurrection
 The Gospel of Judas: The text, the scholarship, and the scandal
 Ungodly Errors: Scholarly gripes about The Da Vinci Code's Jesus
 What Do We Mean by "First-Century Jewish Monotheism"? Society of Biblical Literature 1993 Seminar Papers, ed. E. H. Lovering (Scholars Press, 1993), pp. 348–68

1943 births
2019 deaths
20th-century Christian biblical scholars
21st-century Christian biblical scholars
20th-century Christian theologians
21st-century Christian theologians
Academics from Missouri
Academics of the University of Edinburgh
American biblical scholars
American Christian theologians
Case Western Reserve University alumni
Central Bible College alumni
Deaths from cancer in Scotland
Fellows of the Royal Society of Edinburgh
New Testament scholars
Trinity Evangelical Divinity School alumni
Academic staff of the University of Manitoba
Writers from Kansas City, Missouri